The Military History Society of Ireland promotes the study of military history, and in particular the history of warfare in Ireland and of Irishmen in war. The Honorary Patron is the President of Ireland, Michael D. Higgins.

The society was formed in 1949, co-founded by Gerard Anthony Hayes-McCoy, and has published its official journal; The Irish Sword, continuously since then. The society organises frequent lectures, conferences, field trips and tours. In 2009 the society had 700 members.
The current president of the society is Harman Murtagh and Donal O'Carroll was former president.

References

External links

1949 establishments in Ireland
Historical societies based in the Republic of Ireland
Organizations established in 1949
Military history of Ireland